Tilly of Bloomsbury is a 1940 British comedy film directed by Leslie S. Hiscot and starring Sydney Howard, Jean Gillie, Kathleen Harrison and Henry Oscar. It was based on the play Tilly of Bloomsbury by Ian Hay. The screenplay concerns a young woman who falls in love with an aristocrat, and attempts to convince his family that she is of their social class.

Plot summary

The rich and wealthy aristocrat socialité bachelor Dick Mainwaring falls in love with a beautiful woman from a lower class, Tilly Welwyn, whose mother owns a boarding house. Their backgrounds give rise to problems. Dick is discouraged and behaves like a complete snob towards the hard working mother, but then he learns of the good side of their life. Dick brings Tilly to his family's mansion in the country over the weekend. The visit starts out badly, since his mother, Lady Marion, strongly disapproves with the couple's union. The mother tries to split the couple up, but they are aided by the cunning butler, Samuel Stillbottle. Ultimately their love grows stronger as they overcome their differences, and romance pull the longer straw in the end.

Cast
 Sydney Howard as Samuel Stillbottle 
 Jean Gillie as Tilly Welwyn 
 Henry Oscar as Lucius Welwyn 
 Athene Seyler as Mrs. Banks 
 Michael Wilding as Percy Welwyn 
 Kathleen Harrison as Mrs. Welwyn 
 Athole Stewart as Abel Mainwaring 
 Michael Denison as Dick Mainwaring 
 Martita Hunt as Lady Marion Mainwaring 
 Joy Frankau as Amelia Mainwaring 
 Eve Shelley as Diana

References

External links
 

1940 films
1940s English-language films
Films based on works by Ian Hay
Films directed by Leslie S. Hiscott
1940 comedy films
British comedy films
British black-and-white films
1940s British films